Mézières-sur-Couesnon (literally Mézières on Couesnon; ; Gallo: Maézierr) is a commune in the Ille-et-Vilaine department in Brittany in northwestern France.

Geography
As its name indicates, it is situated on the Couesnon River.

The bordering communes are Saint-Ouen-des-Alleux, Saint-Marc-sur-Couesnon, Saint-Jean-sur-Couesnon, Saint-Aubin-du-Cormier, Gahard, and Vieux-Vy-sur-Couesnon.

Population
Inhabitants of Mézières-sur-Couesnon are called Mézièrais in French.

See also
Communes of the Ille-et-Vilaine department

References

External links

 Geography of Brittany
 The page of the commune on infobretagne.com
 

Communes of Ille-et-Vilaine